Lac de Grand Maison is a lake in Isère, France. At an elevation of 1698 m, its surface area is 2.19 km². It is created by the Grand'Maison Dam (constructed between 1978 and 1985) and serves as the upper reservoir in a pumped-storage hydroelectric scheme.

Grand Maison